This is a list of beaches of Antigua and Barbuda.  There are 365 beaches on Antigua, alone.

Beaches
The following are some of more well known or notable beaches in Antigua and Barbuda:
Buccaneer Cove Beach
Carlisle Bay Beach
Coco Point beach, Barbuda, 
Coral Bay Beach
Darkwood beach, SW Antigua
Deep Bay Beach, Southeast Antigua
Dickison Bay Beach, Northwest Antigua
Doigs Beach, South Antigua
Devil's Bridge beach, Devil's Bridge National Park, Saint Philip, Antigua and Barbuda, 
Eden beach (nude beach), Hawksbill Bay, near Five Islands, Antigua, 
12 beaches, Five Islands, Antigua
Fort James Beach, Fort Bay, Northwest Antigua
Galleon Bay Beach, Freeman's Bay, Antigua, 
Galley Bay beach, Galley Bay, Antigua, 
Half Moon Bay, SE coast, Half Moon National Park, Antigua
Hermitage Bay Beach, near Jolly Harbour
Jabberwock Beach, Northeast Antigua
Johnson's Point, SW Antigua
Jolly beach, Jolly Harbour, Saint Mary, Antigua 
 Little Ffryes Beach, Antigua
 Long Bay beach, East Antigua
Pigeon Point beach, Barbuda, 
Pink sand beach, Barbuda, 
Rendezvous Bay, South Antigua
Runaway Beach, Dickenson Bay, Runaway Bay, Antigua
Sea Grapes Beach, Hawksbill Bay, Antigua
Turner Beach, Antigua

See also
 List of beaches

References

 
Beaches
Antigua and Barbuda
Antigua and Barbuda